This is list of members of the Argentine Senate from 10 December 2019 to 9 December 2021.

Composition

Senate leadership

Election cycles

List of senators

Notes

References

External links
Official site 

2019–2021
2019 in Argentina
2020 in Argentina
2021 in Argentina